The enzyme hyaluronate lyase catalyzes the chemical reaction

Cleaves hyaluronate chains at a β-D-GalNAc-(1→4)-β-D-GlcA bond, ultimately breaking the polysaccharide down to 3-(4-deoxy-β-D-gluc-4-enuronosyl)-N-acetyl-D-glucosamine

This enzyme belongs to the family of lyases, specifically those carbon-oxygen lyases acting on polysaccharides. The systematic name of this enzyme class is hyaluronate lyase. Other names in common use include hyaluronidase (ambiguous), (hyalurononglucosaminidase) (ambiguous), (hyaluronoglucuronidase)], glucuronoglycosaminoglycan lyase, spreading factor, and mucinase (ambiguous).

Structural studies

References

 
 
 

EC 4.2.2
Enzymes of known structure